John Samuel Turner (born 9 September 1980) is a Welsh former professional footballer who played in the Football League, as a goalkeeper.

References

Sources

Sam Turner, Neil Brown

1980 births
Living people
Welsh footballers
Association football goalkeepers
Footballers from Pontypool
Charlton Athletic F.C. players
Stockport County F.C. players
Southall F.C. players
English Football League players